Dhire Bohe Meghna (Literary Meaning Quiet Flows the Meghna) is a 1973 Bengali war film based on the events of the Bangladesh Liberation War. The film is written and directed by Alamgir Kabir and it was his first feature film.

Background 
Initially Zahir Raihan was the original planner of the movie Dhire Bohe Meghna.

Plot

Cast 
 Bobita
 Hasu Banerjee
 Ajmal Huda
 Golam Mustafa
 Anwar Hossain
 Khalil Ullah Khan

Music 
The film's song was written by Mohammad Monirujjaman, composed by Samar Das and background music by Sataya Saha.  Hemanta Mukherjee and Sandhya Mukhopadhyay gave voice for the two songs.

Reception 
In 2002, the British Film Institute's list of South Asian films, Dhire Bohe Meghna was ranked in No. 8 of the top 10 ranked movies.

References

External links 
 
 

1973 films
Bengali-language Bangladeshi films
Bangladeshi war drama films
Films based on the Bangladesh Liberation War
Films set in the 1970s
Films scored by Satya Saha
1970s Bengali-language films
Films directed by Alamgir Kabir